Yang is a Korean surname. According to the 2000 South Korean Census, 486,645 people in South Korea had the surname Yang.

Overview
The family name Yang can be written with four different hanja, indicating different lineages. The 2000 South Korean Census found a total of 486,645 people in 151,315 households with these family names.

Hanja meaning "bridge" (梁 or 樑)
Deulbo Yang (들보 양), meaning "bridge", is by far the most common of the four surname hanja read Yang, used by 389,152 people in 120,534 households. This made it the 25th-most common surname among the 288 surnames distinguished by the 2000 Census. Additionally, another 3,254 people in 960 households used the variant form (with a "tree" radical added on the left); that variant alone was the 144th-most common surname. They identified with 32 different bon-gwan (hometown of a clan lineage, not necessarily the actual residence of clan members):
Namwon, North Jeolla: 218,546 people in 67,691 households. They claim descent from Yang U-ryang (梁友諒), a descendant of the Jeju Yang clan's ancestor Yang Eul-na who came to Namwon during the reign of Gyeongdeok of Silla.
Jeju: 133,355 people in 41,169 households. They claim descent from Yang Eul-na (梁乙那) of the Tamna kingdom in modern-day Jeju, whose surname was originally another character (良). Yang Sun (梁洵), a descendant of Yang Eul-na, then came to Silla in the mainland of Korea during the reign of King Sinmun, and the Namwon and Cheongju clans later branched off from the Jeju clan.
Namyang (today Hwaseong, Gyeonggi): 7,280 people in 2,173 households. Additionally, this was the bon-gwan reported by nearly all (3,211 people in 957 households) of the people who used the variant form ; two others reported a different bon-gwan, while the other 41 did not report a bon-gwan at all.
Cheongju, North Chungcheong: 8,499 people in 2,649 households.
Gyeongju, North Gyeongsang: 6,274 people in 1,990 households.
Other or unreported bon-gwan: 15,171 people in 4,862 households.

Hanja meaning "willow" (楊)
Beodeul Yang (버들 양), meaning "willow", is the second-most common of the four surname hanja read Yang, used by 93,416 people in 29,558 households. This made it the 55th-most common surname in the 2000 Census.

Hanja meaning "assist" (襄)
Doul Yang (도울 양), meaning "assist", is the least common of the four surname hanja read Yang, used by 823 people in 263 households. This made it the 182nd-most common surname in the 2000 Census. The census did not report the bon-gwan for this surname.

Notable people with the surname

Academic
 Yang Ji-won (born 1949), South Korean professor of chemical and bio-molecular engineering at KAIST

Business
 Michael Yang (born 1961), South Korean-born American entrepreneur

Entertainment/film
 Yang Dong-geun (born 1979), South Korean actor, rapper, singer-songwriter, record producer and breakdancer
 Yang Hee-kyung (born 1954), South Korean actress
 Yang Hyun-suk (born 1969), South Korean music executive, founder and CEO of YG Entertainment
 Yang Ik-june (born 1975), South Korean actor and director
 Yang Jin-sung (born 1988), South Korean actress
 Yang Jung-a (born 1971), South Korean actress
 Yang Mi-kyung (born 1961), South Korean actress
 Shin Min-a (born Yang Min-a, 1984), South Korean actress and model
 Yang Se-jong (born 1992), South Korean model and actor
 Yang Seung-pil (born 1992), South Korean actor
 Yang Soobin (born 1994), South Korean mukbang entertainer
 Yang Yong-hi (born 1964), Japanese-born Korean film director
 Yang Yun-ho (born 1966), South Korean film director and screenwriter
 Yang Se-hyung (born 1985), South Korean comedian and entertainer
 Yang Se-chan (born 1986), South Korean comedian
 Eugene Lee Yang (born 1986), South Korean American actor, producer, author, director, activist and internet celebrity

Literature
 Yang Gui-ja (born 1955), South Korean writer

Military
 Yang Kyoungjong, (1920–1992) Korean soldier who fought for the Imperial Japanese Army, the Soviet Red Army, and the German Wehrmacht during World War II
 Yang Sung-sook, South Korean general

Music
 Yang Bang-ean (born 1960), Tokyo-born Korean composer, arranger, record producer, and pianist
 Yang Hee-eun (born 1952), South Korean singer and songwriter
 Yang Hong-seok (born 1994), South Korean singer and member of boy band Pentagon
 Yang Seung-ho (born 1987), South Korean singer, leader of boy group MBLAQ
 Sung-Won Yang, South Korean cellist, professor of cello at the Yonsei University School of Music

Politics
 Yang Gi-tak (1871–1938), Korean independence activist, 9th president of the Provisional Government of the Republic of Korea
 Yang Sung-chul (born 1939), South Korean diplomat who served as Seoul's ambassador to the U.S. from 2000–2003

Sports
 Yang Dong-geun (born 1981), South Korean retired basketball player
 Yang Dongi (born 1984), South Korean mixed martial artist
 Yang Hak-seon (born 1992), South Korean gymnast, country's first Olympic gold medalist in gymnastics
 Yang Hee-jong (born 1984), South Korean basketball player, national team member
 Yang Hong-seok (born 1997), South Korean basketball player, national team member
 Yang Joon-hyuk (born 1969), South Korean retired baseball outfielder
 Yang Hyeon-jong (born 1988), South Korean professional baseball pitcher
 Yang Jung-mo (born 1953), South Korean retired freestyle wrestler and the country's first Olympic gold medalist
 Yang Shin-young (born 1990), South Korean short-track and long-track speed skater
 Yang Tae-hwa (born 1982), South Korean retired ice dancer, national champion from 1999-2002
 Yang Tae-young (born 1980), South Korean 2004 Olympic bronze medalist in the individual all-around event in artistic gymnastics
 Yang Yong-eun (born 1972), South Korean professional golfer and winner of 2009 PGA Championship
 Yang Young-ja (born 1964), South Korean professional table tennis player who won gold at the 1988 Olympics

Visual arts/fashion
 Niki Yang (born 1985), South Korean animator, writer, storyboard artist, and voice actress

Fictional characters
 Cristina Yang: fictional character on Grey's Anatomy played by Sandra Oh

See also 
 Jeju Province
 Liang (surname)
 List of Korean Americans
 List of Korean family names
 Yang (surname)

References

External links
 Yang family history at ancestry.com

Korean-language surnames
Surnames